Philippe Jabre is the founder, CEO and CIO of Jabre Capital Partners S.A, a Geneva-based wealth and asset management firm and multi-family office, and a former managing director of GLG Partners, a UK-based hedge fund.

Early life
Jabre, born in 1960 in Beirut, Lebanon, studied at college Notre-Dame de Jamhour.

He graduated from Concordia University in 1980 with a BBA and earned an MBA from Columbia Business School in 1982, where he is a member of the Board of Overseers.

Career
Jabre trained at JP Morgan and then BNP Paribas the French bank. In his 16 years there, he specialised in the budding market for convertible arbitrage, a strategy that involved buying a company’s convertible bonds and selling short the company’s stock.

GLG Partners
After joining GLG in 1997 and having a significant impact on the hedge fund's growth and success, Jabre left GLG after 9 years in 2006, during a 2-year investigation by the FSA. Individuals familiar with the firm say GLG came to view Mr. Jabre as someone who took unnecessary risks. Jabre was fined £750,000 for market abuse in 2006 for breaching FSA principles. This was, at that time, the largest fine the FSA had issued against an individual.

Financial Services Authority (UK) Fine
From the FSA website: "On 11 February 2003 Mr Jabre was 'wall crossed' by Goldman Sachs International as part of the pre-marketing of a new issue of convertible preference shares in Sumitomo Mitsui Financial Group Inc (SMFG). Mr Jabre was given confidential information and agreed to be restricted from dealing SMFG securities until the issue was announced. Mr Jabre breached this restriction by short selling around $16 million of SMFG ordinary shares on 12–14 February 2003. When the new issue was announced on 17 February 2003, Mr Jabre made a substantial profit for the GLG Market Neutral Fund." At first he planned on appealing the fine, but then withdrew his appeal.

The FSA's Regulatory Decisions Committee “decided that Mr Jabre did not deliberately commit market abuse, ruling that he did not violate the FSA’s Principle 1 governing market integrity”. The Committee opted not to ban or suspend Jabre. In an interview with CNBC, Jabre asserted that “when he was fined in London for market abuse, the rules and regulations were "not as clear" as they are now"

Jabre Capital Partners
On October 11, 2006 it was announced that Philippe Jabre was set to open a new hedge fund in Geneva, Switzerland, after his non-compete contract with GLG Partners expired. The fund opened in February 2007 and was one of the largest new launches in recent years, as many of Jabre's old clients followed him to his new venture, along with a significant number of new investors. The fund - JabCap Multi Strategy Fund  - closed very shortly afterwards with  $5 billion under management and Jabre Capital Partners having been one of the largest hedge funds in Switzerland at the time.

In 2018 Mr Jabre decided to draw a line under his hedge fund activities. He returned external capital in the funds as part of a restructuring of the firm, and decided to refocus on its historical wealth management activities. Since June 2020, Jabre Capital Partners has relaunched its asset management activities focused on the firm’s core strategies.

Brasserie Almaza

In 2018 Mr Jabre decided to draw a line under his hedge fund activities. He returned external capital in the funds as part of a restructuring of the firm, and decided to refocus on its historical wealth management activities. Since June 2020, Jabre Capital Partners has relaunched its asset management activities focused on the firm’s core strategies.

Jabre Capital Partners is an active member of the Association Suisse des Gérants de Fortune (ASG).

Awards and industry recognition 
In 2013 Jabre Capital was one of Europe's top-performing hedge funds and won EuroHedge’s Management Firm of the Year award.

In March 2014 the firm won three awards at the HedgePo Investors Choice Awards: Fund of the Year, Global Equity Fund of the Year and Global Multi-strategy Fund of the Year.

Mr. Jabre also wrote the foreword of The Handbook of Convertible Bonds: Pricing, Strategies and Risk Management of Jan De Spiegeleer and Wim Schoutens

Personal life
He is a skier. He is also married with four children.
Philippe is a trustee for the American University of Beirut.

He is also the founder of the not-for-profit Association Philippe Jabre (APJ) based in Beirut, which provides financial aid to Lebanese people in need, including the distribution of university grants to students seeking to pursue higher education and post doctorates. Between 2001 and 2021, the APJ granted university scholarships to 2,568 students, according to their website.

His house above Beirut, a family property creatively renovated after suffering heavy damage during the Lebanese Civil War, was designed by architect Nabil Gholam.

References

External links
 http://www.fsa.gov.uk/pages/Library/Communication/PR/2006/077.shtml
 http://www.toomre.com/JabreNewFund
 https://www.bloomberg.com/apps/news?pid=20601109&refer=home&sid=a.cK5w3GUwK4
 https://www.bloomberg.com/apps/news?pid=20601087&sid=aVeK6RWodq5M&refer=home

Living people
1960 births
Lebanese expatriates in Switzerland
Columbia Business School alumni
Businesspeople from Beirut
Chief investment officers
Concordia University alumni